Solariella pygmaea is a species of sea snail, a marine gastropod mollusk in the family Solariellidae.

Description
The size of the shell attains 2 mm.

Distribution
This marine species occurs off the Philippines.

References

External links
 

pygmaea
Gastropods described in 2006